Die Lit is the debut studio album by American rapper Playboi Carti. It was released on May 11, 2018, by AWGE Label and Interscope Records. The album features guest appearances from Skepta, Travis Scott, Lil Uzi Vert, Pi'erre Bourne, Nicki Minaj, Bryson Tiller, Chief Keef, Gunna, Red Coldhearted, Young Thug, and Young Nudy. The production on the album was mainly handled by Pi'erre Bourne, with assistance from Don Cannon and IndigoChildRick, among others.

Die Lit received generally positive reviews from critics and debuted at number three on the US Billboard 200.

Background and release
In December 2017, a video showed Playboi Carti behind a mixing board, presumably listening to new material with the caption "Album Mode". In March 2018, Pi'erre Bourne teased that the project had been finalized via Twitter. On May 10, 2018, Carti announced the album's release date via Twitter. On the same day, ASAP Rocky revealed the album's artwork. Upon release, the album was briefly released exclusively via Tidal, before showing up on other streaming services.

Critical reception

Die Lit was met with generally positive reviews. At Metacritic, which assigns a normalized rating out of 100 to reviews from professional publications, the album received an average score of 71, based on seven reviews.

Evan Rytlewski of Pitchfork stated that Die Lit is "an album that works almost completely from its own lunatic script. It is a perversely infectious sugar high, rap that fundamentally recalibrates the brain's reward centers", praising the production and simplicity. Corrigan B of Tiny Mix Tapes said, "Like its predecessor, it's an album of party records; these are songs that will be played ad infinitum at functions until the hooks, the breaks, and, of course, the bass are burned into the brain of every attendee". Maxwell Cavaseno of HotNewHipHop concluded that Die Lit "feels like the closest to a fully realized album as Carti is ever going to come close to achieving" and that it "should, at the very least, be respected for doing so much while doing so very little". Online publication Sputnikmusic stated: "A lot of the gratification of this record is in the production, which takes the age-old hip-hop trick of taking a fractional melodic idea, barely a song by itself, and spinning out of it a thick sonic weave."

A. Harmony from Exclaim! criticized the album for having a lack of variety, saying "It's fun enough but, save for a few keepers, has the lifespan of a mayfly. Rock to it for the summer and forget most of it by September". Riley Wallace of HipHopDX stated, "Through a more respectable body of work—is unlikely to win over any naysayers". Neil Z. Yeung of AllMusic said, "Like Rae Sremmurd and Migos, these big-bass trap anthems owe much to their club-friendly vibe, but offer little in terms of substance or lasting impact".

Year-end lists

Commercial performance
Die Lit debuted at number three on the US Billboard 200 chart, earning 61,000 album-equivalent units (including 5,000 copies as pure album sales) in its first week. On July 31, 2019, the album was certified gold by the Recording Industry Association of America (RIAA) for combined sales and streams in excess of 500,000 units in the United States. As of January 2021, the album has earned 1.1 million album-equivalent units and net 1.67 billion on-demand streams for its tracks.

Track listing
All tracks written by Jordan Carter and Jordan Jenks, and produced by Pi'erre Bourne, except where noted.

Notes
  signifies an uncredited co-producer

Sample credits
 "R.I.P." contains a sample from "What About Us", written by Donald DeGrate, Jr., Reginald Moore, Shirley Murdock, Larry Troutman and Roger Troutman, as performed by Jodeci.
 "Fell in Luv" contains a sample from "Grandloves", written by Megan James, Corin Roddick and Isaac Gerasimou, as performed by Purity Ring.

Charts

Weekly charts

Year-end charts

Certifications

References

2018 debut albums
Albums produced by Don Cannon
Albums produced by Pi'erre Bourne
Playboi Carti albums
Mumble rap albums
Southern hip hop albums